Nathan Francis Mossell (July 27, 1856 – October 27, 1946) was the first African-American graduate of the University of Pennsylvania School of Medicine in 1882. He did post-graduate training at hospitals in Philadelphia and London.  In 1888, he was the first black physician elected as member of the Philadelphia County Medical Society in Pennsylvania.  He helped found the Frederick Douglass Memorial Hospital and Training School in West Philadelphia in 1895, which he led as chief-of-staff and medical director until he retired in 1933.

Early life and education
Nathan Mossell was born in Hamilton, Canada in 1856, the fourth of six children. Both his parents, Eliza Bowers (1824 – ?) and Aaron Albert Mossell I (1824 – ?), were descended from freed slaves. According to Mossell's autobiography, his mother's stories of the discrimination and hardship their families faced strengthened her own children's determination to succeed. Mossell's maternal grandfather had resisted all attempts by his owner to make him work and was eventually freed. He married and settled in Baltimore, but the entire family, including Mossell's mother, who was a child at the time, were deported to Trinidad. Mossell's paternal grandfather, who had been transported from the coast of West Africa, managed to buy his freedom and that of his wife. He too settled in Baltimore, where Mossell's father was born.

Nathan Mossell's parents met and married in Baltimore after his mother's family return from Trinidad. His father learned the brickmaking trade and saved enough money to buy a house. After the birth of their third child, the couple decided to move to Canada, as free blacks were prohibited from being educated in Maryland and they wanted education for their children. They sold their house in Baltimore and settled in Hamilton, Ontario. His father bought a tract of clay-bearing land and set up his own brickworks.

Nathan's siblings were the following:
May (1848 - ?) born in Maryland.
Charles (1850 - ) born in Maryland. He graduated from Lincoln University and studied theology in Boston, later becoming a missionary in Haiti.
Boy, (c. 1853 – c. 1870), born in Maryland and died in Lockport, New York.
Alvarilla (b. 1857 – ?), born in Hamilton, Canada. She worked with her brother Charles as a missionary in Haiti.
Aaron Albert Mossell II (1863–1951), born in Hamilton, Canada. He was the first African American to graduate from the University of Pennsylvania Law School. He married Louisa Tanner (1866 – ?). In 1921 their daughter Sadie Tanner Mossell (1898–1989) became the first African-American woman to receive a Ph.D. in the United States, earning a degree in economics at the University of Pennsylvania.

During the Civil War, the family moved back to the United States, settling in Lockport, New York, where Mossell's father again owned his own brickmaking business. Along with his siblings, Mossell attended the local public school in Lockport. His schooling became erratic once he started working part-time at age nine for his father. He eventually joined his elder brother Charles at Lincoln University, a historically black college in Pennsylvania, where he studied Natural Science, receiving his Bachelor of Arts degree in 1879.

Later life and medical career

Mossell went on to study at the University of Pennsylvania School of Medicine, becoming its first African-American graduate in 1882. He did post-graduate training at hospitals in Philadelphia, including the Pennsylvania University Hospital, and later at Guy's Hospital, Queen's Hospital, and St Thomas' Hospital in London.

After his return to the United States, in 1888 Mossell became the first black physician elected as member of the Philadelphia County Medical Society. That year he also started his private practice. In 1895, he helped found the Frederick Douglass Memorial Hospital and Training School in West Philadelphia, serving as its chief-of-staff and medical director until his retirement in 1933.

Marriage and family
He had married Gertrude Emily Hicks Bustill (1848-1955), a member of the prominent Bustill family, on July 12, 1893 in Philadelphia. The couple had two daughters, Florence Mossell and Mary Campbell Mossell. Gertrude was the mixed-race daughter of Charles Hicks Bustill (1816–1890), who was of African, European and Lenape ancestry, and Emily Robinson. Gertrude's sister and brother-in law, Maria Louisa Bustill and  William Drew Robeson, were the parents of the singer, actor, and Civil Rights advocate Paul Robeson.

Private practice
After retiring as director of the hospital in 1933, Mossell continued to work in his private practice, which he had opened in 1888.

He died on October 27, 1946 in Philadelphia at the age of 90. He was believed to be the oldest practicing black physician at the time of his death.

References

External links 
 Nathan Francis Mossell Papers 1873-1983 (bulk 1885-1945) at the University of Pennsylvania University Archives and Records Center

1856 births
1946 deaths
Lincoln University (Pennsylvania) alumni
People from Hamilton, Ontario
Robeson-Bustill family
Perelman School of Medicine at the University of Pennsylvania alumni
African-American physicians
Physicians from Philadelphia
American hospital administrators
Mossell family
20th-century African-American people